Richard Jobson (fl. 1620–1623) was an English explorer of West Africa. He is only known from his writings on his 1620–1621 voyage to the Gambia River.

Life
He was appointed in 1620 to command an expedition to explore the River Gambia, for a group of adventurers. Former attempts in 1618 and 1619 had been failure, because of consequence of the hostility of the Portuguese and health problems.

Jobson, sailing from England on 25 October 1620, and arriving at the mouth of the Gambia on 17 November, went up the river beyond the Barrakunda Falls, to the Tenda area. He did not find the gold he sought.

Somewhere in Gambia, Jobson refused to purchase some female slaves, stating that "We were a people, who did not deal in any such commodities, neither did wee buy or sell one another, or any that had our owne shapes;"

Works
After his return to England in 1621, Jobson published The Golden Trade. He gives  accounts of the Africans, then largely unknown to the English, though they had overland trade 
to the north coast.

Notes

External links
 Online version of Jobson's The Golden Trade

Attribution

Explorers of Africa
17th-century English writers
17th-century English male writers
English explorers
English travel writers
Year of birth missing
Year of death missing